The 2017–18 Wichita State Shockers women's basketball team will represent Wichita State University in the 2017–18 NCAA Division I women's basketball season. They play their home games at Charles Koch Arena, which has a capacity of 10,506. The Shockers, led by first year head coach Keitha Adams were first year members of the American Athletic Conference. They finished the season 14–17, 9–7 in AAC play to finish in a tie for fifth place. They lost in the first round of the AAC women's tournament to Temple.

Roster

Schedule

|-
!colspan=9 style="background:#000; color:#FFC318;"| Exhibition

|-
!colspan=9 style="background:#000; color:#FFC318;"| Non-conference regular season

|-
!colspan=9 style="background:#000; color:#FFC318;"| AAC regular season

|-
!colspan=9 style="background:#000; color:#FFC318;"| AAC Women's Tournament

See also
2017–18 Wichita State Shockers men's basketball team

References

Wichita State Shockers women's basketball seasons
Wichita State